The Krupanidhi Group of Institution (/krupa-ni-dhi/) are a group of colleges managed by the Krupanidhi Educational Trust, based in Kormangala, Bangalore, India. The institution was founded in 1985 by educationists Suresh Nagpal and Geetha Nagpal and philanthropist Sunil Samson Dhamanigi.

Colleges
The Krupanidhi Group of Institutions includes the following colleges:

 Pharmacy college
 Physiotherapy college
 Nursing college
 Business school
 Degree College
 Residential Pre-University College
 Pre-University College

Affiliation
The Krupanidhi College of Pharmacy is registered by the University Grants Commission (UGC), temporarily affiliated with Rajiv Gandhi University of Health Sciences (RGUHS) and approved by the Pharmacy Council of India (PCI). The Krupanidhi Degree College is affiliated with Bangalore University (BU).

References 

Business schools in Bangalore
Colleges affiliated to Bangalore University
Colleges in Bangalore
Medical colleges in Karnataka
Pharmacy schools in India
Pre University colleges in Karnataka
International schools in Bangalore
Educational institutions established in 1985
1985 establishments in Karnataka